The following is a discography of production by Easy Mo Bee, an American hip hop musician and record producer.

1989

Big Daddy Kane - It's a Big Daddy Thing 
 02. "Another Victory"
 07. "Calling Mr. Welfare" (featuring DJ Red Alert)

1990

Angela - Love Me (For Being Me) (VLS) 
 B1. "Love Me (For Being Me) (Vocal Version)" (produced by Easy Mo Bee & Mister Cee)
 B2. "Love Me (For Being Me) (Love Club Dub)" (produced by Easy Mo Bee & Mister Cee)
 B3. "Love Me (For Being Me) (Strictly Hip House)" (produced by Easy Mo Bee & Mister Cee)

1991

The Genius - Words from the Genius 
 02. "Phony as Ya Wanna Be"
 03. "True Fresh M.C."	
 04. "The Genius Is Slammin'"	
 05. "Words from a Genius"	
 07. "Feel the Pain"	
 08. "Those Were the Days"	
 09. "Life of a Drug Dealer"	
 10. "Stop the Nonsense"	
 11. "Living Foul"	
 12. "Drama"

IAM - Tam Tam de l'Afrique (VLS) 
 A2. "Tam Tam de l'Afrique (Easy Mo Bee Mix)"

J Rock - Save the Children (VLS) 
 B1. "I Get Rek" (produced by Easy Mo Bee & Patrick Harvey)
 B2. "I Get Rek-reational" (produced by Easy Mo Bee & Patrick Harvey)

J Rock - Streetwize 
 01. "Let Me Introduce Myself" (co-produced by J Rock)

Nikke Nicole - Nikke Does It Better (VLS) 
 B1. "Nikke Does It Better (Easy Does It Vocal)"

Nikke Nicole - Sexy! (VLS) 
 B1. "Silky Silk"

Prince Rakeem - Ooh I Love You Rakeem 
 04. "Sexcapades (DMD Mix)" (co-produced by Prince Rakeem)
 05. "Sexcapades (Wu-Tang Mix)" (co-produced by Prince Rakeem)

Rappin' Is Fundamental - The Doo-Hop Legacy 
 01. "Swing of Things"
 02. "Highway to Heaven"	
 03. "Now That You Know My Name"	
 04. "Them Boys Are Getting There" (additional production by Tomie)
 05. "You Wanna Trip"	
 06. "Speak Softly"	
 07. "Rapping Is Fundamental"	
 08. "Ain't No Smoke (Without Fire)"	
 09. "Whenever You Need an MC / I'll Be Around"	
 10. "Figurin' to Get Ill"	
 11. "I Wonder If She Thinks of Me"

Rappin' Is Fundamental - Rapping Is Fundamental (VLS) 
 A1. "Rapping Is Fundamental (Radio Remix)"

1992

IAM - Planète Mars (VLS) 
 B1. "Planète Mars (Mo Bee Mix)"

Miles Davis - Blow (VLS) 
 B1. "Blow (New Orleans Hip-Hop Remix)"
 B3. "Blow (Miles Alone)"

Miles Davis - Doo-Bop 
 01. "Mystery"	 	
 02. "The Doo-Bop Song"	 	
 03. "Chocolate Chip"	
 04. "High Speed Chase"	
 05. "Blow"	
 06. "Sonya"	
 07. "Fantasy"
 08. "Duke Booty"
 09. "Mystery (Reprise)"

Various artists - Gladiator (Music from the Motion Picture) 
 04. "Gladiator (Easy Mo Bee Remix)" (performed by 3rd Bass)

1993

Big Daddy Kane - Looks Like a Job For... 
 06. "Stop Shammin'"
 08. "Rest in Peace"
 10. "Here Comes Kane, Scoob and Scrap" (featuring Scoob Lover and Scrap Lover)
 13. "'Nuff Respect (Remix)"

Candy Dulfer - Pick Up the Pieces (VLS) 
 A2. "Pick Up the Pieces (Easy Mo Bee Mix)"

Candy Dulfer - Sax-a-Go-Go (VLS) 
 B2. "Sax-a-Go-Go (Easy Mo Bee Mix)"

LL Cool J - Pink Cookies in a Plastic Bag Getting Crushed by Buildings (VLS) 
 B1. "Pink Cookies in a Plastic Bag Getting Crushed by Buildings (Remix)"

The Notorious B.I.G. - N/A 
 00. "Dead Wrong" (original version)
 00. "Hope You Niggas Sleep" (original version)

Various artists - Who's the Man? soundtrack 
 01. "Party and Bullshit" (performed by The Notorious B.I.G.)

1994

Big Daddy Kane - Daddy's Home 
 02. "Brooklyn Style...Laid Out" (featuring Scoob Lover)
 06. "That's How I Did 'Em"
 09. "The Way It's Goin' Down"

Big Scoob - Suckaz Can't Hang (VLS) 
 A1. "Suckaz Can't Hang" (produced by Big Scoob, co-produced by Easy Mo Bee)
 B1. "Booty Bandit" (produced by Big Scoob, co-produced by Easy Mo Bee)

Craig Mack - Flava in Ya Ear (VLS) 
 A2. "Flava in Ya Ear (Remix)" (featuring The Notorious B.I.G., Rampage, LL Cool J & Busta Rhymes) (produced by Easy Mo Bee, Chucky Thompson & Puff Daddy)
 A3. "Flava in Ya Ear (Easy Mo Mix)"

Craig Mack - Project Funk da World
 02. "Get Down"
 05. "Flava in Ya Ear"
 07. "Judgement Day"
 09. "Mainline"
 10. "When God Comes"

Crystal Waters - Storyteller 
 09. "Listen for My Beep" (produced by Easy Mo Bee & The LG Experience)
 12. "Piece of Lonely" (bonus track) (produced by Easy Mo Bee & The LG Experience)

Da Brat - Give It 2 You (CDS) 
 02. "Give It 2 You (Easy Mo Remix)"

Freddie Foxxx - So Tough (VLS) 
 B3. "So Tough (Easy's Mo Tough Mix)" (featuring Queen Latifah)

Heavy D & the Boyz - Black Coffee (VLS) 
 A1. "Black Coffee (Hip Hop Remix)" 
 A2. "Black Coffee (Manslaughter Mix)"

Heavy D & the Boyz - I Got Love for Ya (VLS) 
 A1. "I Got Love for Ya (Hip Hop Remix)" (additional production by Poke)

Heavy D & the Boyz - Nuttin' but Love 
 11. "Black Coffee" (co-produced by Pete Rock)

The Notorious B.I.G. - Ready to Die 
 03. "Gimme the Loot"	
 04. "Machine Gun Funk"	
 05. "Warning"	
 06. "Ready to Die"
 09. "The What" (featuring Method Man)
 15. "Friend of Mine"

Public Enemy - Muse Sick-n-Hour Mess Age 
 12. "Aintnuttin Buttersong" (produced by The Bomb Squad, co-produced by Easy Mo Bee)
 17. "I Stand Accused" (produced by The Bomb Squad, co-produced by Easy Mo Bee)

Rappin' Is Fundamental - You Ain't Really Down (VLS) 
 A1. "You Ain't Really Down"
 B1. "Helluva Guy"

Slick Rick - Behind Bars 
 05. "Cuz It's Wrong"

Thug Life - Thug Life: Volume 1 
 10. "Str8 Ballin'"

Whitehead Bros. - Forget I Was a G (VLS) 
 A3. "Forget I Was a G (Easy Mo Bee's Remix)"

1995

2Pac - Me Against the World 
 02. "If I Die 2Nite"
 05. "Temptations"

Channel Live - Reprogram (VLS) 
 A2. "Reprogram (Remix)"

Dana Dane - Show Me Love (VLS) 
 A1. "Show Me Love (Easy Mo Bee Remix)"

Das EFX - Hold It Down 
 03. "Knockin' Niggaz Off"
 07. "Microphone Master"
 08. "40 & a Blunt"
 12. "Alright"
 13. "Hold It Down"

Doug E. Fresh - Play 
 02. "It's On!" (featuring Vicious & Singing Melody) (co-produced by DJ Barry B, Doug E. Fresh & Shim Sham)

Herb McGruff - I Know We Can Do It (VLS) 
 B1. "I Know We Can Do It" (produced by Heavy D, co-produced by Easy Mo Bee)

Ill Al Skratch - Chill with That (VLS) 
 A1. "Chill with That (Easy Mo Bee's Radio Mix)"

Jamal - Last Chance, No Breaks 
 01. "Live Illegal"
 04. "Insane Creation" (featuring Redman)

King Just - Mystics of the God 
 06. "No Flow on the Rodeo"
 09. "Can I Get Some"

Little Shawn - Dom Perignon (VLS) 
 B1. "Check It Out Y'All"

LL Cool J - Mr. Smith 
 06. "Life As..."

Nas - N/A 
 00. "Life Is Like a Dice Game"

Positive K - Mr. Jiggliano (VLS)  
 B1. "It's All Gravy (Remix)"

Somethin' for the People - You Want This Party Started (VLS) 
 A1. "You Want This Party Started (Easy Mo Bee Remix)" (featuring Grand Puba)

Trends of Culture - When Trend Men Come 
 02. "Make a Move"
 10. "Other Man Lover Man"

Tha Tribezmen - Who Got the Vibes (VLS) 
 A2. "Who Got the Vibes"
 B2. "Peep into the Mind"

Various artists - New Jersey Drive, Vol. 1 
 11. "Check It Out" (performed by Heavy D)

Various artists - One Million Strong 
 02. "Runnin'" (performed by 2Pac, The Notorious B.I.G., Dramacydal & Stretch)

Various artists - Panther soundtrack 
 06. "The Points" (performed by The Notorious B.I.G., Coolio, Doodlebug, Big Mike, Buckshot, Redman, Ill Al Skratch, Rock, Bone Thugs-n-Harmony, Busta Rhymes, Menace Clan & Jamal)

Various artists - Pump Ya Fist (Hip Hop Inspired by the Black Panthers) 
 04. "Shades of Black" (performed by Rakim)

Various artists - The Show: The Soundtrack 
 04. "My Block" (performed by 2Pac)

Wessyde Goon Squad - Crazy (VLS) 
 B3. "Paper Chase"

1996

Busta Rhymes - The Coming 
 03. "Everything Remains Raw"
 06. "It's a Party" (featuring Zhané)

Lost Boyz - Legal Drug Money 
 04. "Jeeps, Lex Coups, Bimaz & Benz"
 05. "Lifestyles of the Rich & Shameless"	
 10. "Is This da Part"

Majette - Ms. Winey Winey (Life of da Party) (VLS) 
 B1. "Ms. Winey Winey (Life of da Party) (Mo Bee Mix)"

Shaquille O'Neal - You Can't Stop the Reign 
 16. "Game of Death" (featuring Rakim)

Various artists - The New Groove: The Blue Note Remix Project 
 09. "The Sophisticated Hippie (Easy Mo Bee Remix)" (performed by Horace Silver)

Various artists - Sunset Park soundtrack 
 07. "Elements I'm Among" (performed by Queen Latifah)

1997

Tha Alkaholiks - Likwidation 
 02. "Likwidation"
 11. "Aww Shit!" (produced by E-Swift, co-produced by Easy Mo Bee)

Busta Rhymes - When Disaster Strikes... 
 12. "Things We Be Doin' for Money (Part 1)"

Chubb Rock - Life (VLS) 
 B2. "Life (Original Mix)" (featuring Syncere)

Chubb Rock - The Mind 
 02. "I Am What I Am"
 07. "Games We Play"

Craig Mack - What I Need (The Remix) (VLS) 
 A2. "What I Need (The Remix)"

The Lady of Rage - Necessary Roughness 
 02. "Necessary Roughness"
 08. "Breakdown"

Lost Boyz - Love, Peace & Nappiness 
 04. "My Crew" (featuring A+ & Canibus)

MC Eiht - Hit the Floor Remixes (VLS) 
 A3. "Hit the Floor (Easy Mo Bee Remix)" (featuring Daz Dillinger)

Nice & Smooth - IV : Blazing Hot 
 01. "NY (Intro)"
 02. "Boogie Down Bronx / BK Connection" (featuring Rappin' Is Fundamental)

The Notorious B.I.G. - Life After Death 
 1-07. "I Love the Dough" (featuring Jay-Z & Angela Winbush)	
 2-04. "Going Back to Cali"

Various artists - Bee Mo Easy Entertainment Presents... 1997 Sampler 
 01. "Doo-Hop" (performed by Rappin' Is Fundamental)
 02. "Who's da Man" (performed by Rappin' Is Fundamental)
 03. "What's Ya Rep" (performed by Da Nation)
 04. "Whatchuwantboo? (Cars & Cash)" (performed by Da Nation)
 05. "Show da Meaning" (performed by Soul Survivors)
 06. "Strictly Hip-Hop" (performed by Soul Survivors)

1998

Big Daddy Kane - Veteranz' Day 
 02. "Uncut, Pure"
 06. "La-La-Land"

Kurupt - Kuruption! 
 2-02. "Light Shit Up" (featuring Buckshot)

Paula Perry - Tales from Fort Knox 
 03. "Down to Die for This" (featuring Jesse West)

Ras Kass - Rasassination 
 15. "Grindin'" (featuring Bad Azz)
 18. "The End" (featuring RZA)

1999

Easy Mo Bee - Good Life (VLS) 
 A1. "Good Life" (featuring AZ, Mack 10 & Dave Morris)

Goodie Mob - World Party 
 13. "Fie Fie Delish"

2000

Craig Mack - Mack Come Thru (VLS) 
 A1. "Mack Come Thru"
 B1. "What Up 4, 5"

Easy Mo Bee - Now or Never: Odyssey 2000 
 02. "Sunstroke" (featuring Sauce Money, Da Ranjahz & Geda K)
 04. "Instrumental No. 1"
 05. "Shit's Goin' Down Tonite" (featuring Da Nation & Kurupt)
 06. "Soul" (featuring Gang Starr)
 07. "Talkin' Bout You" (featuring Rah Digga)
 08. "Instrumental No. 2"	
 09. "N.Y.C." (featuring Kool G Rap & Jinx da Juvy)
 11. "Sex, Money, Drugs" (featuring Da Nation & C-Lo)
 12. "Instrumental No. 3"
 13. "Sound of My Heart" (featuring Snoop Dogg, Glaze N.Y. & Ken)
 14. "Let's Make a Toast" (featuring Flipmode Squad & American Cream Team)	
 16. "Make Em Bounce" (featuring Angie Martinez & Doo Wop)	
 17. "Dis Beat Is Mine" (featuring Rappin' Is Fundamental)
 18. "Instrumental No. 4"
 20. "Always Be There for You" (featuring Dave Morris & Da Nation)
 21. "We Pledge Allegiance" (featuring Cocoa Brovaz & Prodigy)

Ilacoin - Keep It Street (VLS) 
 B3. "This That & the 3rd"

Mack 10 - The Paper Route 
 10. "Hustle Game"

2001

Marley Marl - Re-Entry 
 04. "Spazz" (featuring Solo)

Mr. Cheeks - John P. Kelly 
 05. "Here We Come"

2002

Afu-Ra - Life Force Radio 
 04. "Hip Hop"
 09. "Perverted Monks"
 11. "Readjustment"

Various artists - D&D Project II 
 04. "Juicy Loosey" (performed by D&D Crew, Craig G, Don Parmazhane, Jack Venom & QNC)
 06. "What's Life" (performed by Krumb Snatcha)

2003

Alicia Keys - The Diary of Alicia Keys 
 04. "If I Was Your Woman / Walk on By" (produced by Alicia Keys, Easy Mo Bee & D'wayne Wiggins)

2004

Mos Def - The New Danger 
 04. "Zimzallabim" (produced by Easy Mo Bee & Mos Def)

Shyheim - 21st Century Crisis (VLS) 
 A1. "21st Century Crisis"

Shyheim - The Greatest Story Never Told 
 15. "Easy Street" (featuring La the Darkman)

2005

Kindred the Family Soul - In This Life Together 
 11. "As of Yet" (co-produced by Kindred the Family Soul)

QNC - Duo Dynamic 
 10. "Polaroid Dimepiece"

Various artists - Motown Remixed 
 10. "Just My Imagination (Running Away with Me) (Easy Mo Bee Remix)" (performed by The Temptations)

2006

Blaq Poet - Rewind: Deja Screw 
 11. "You Fucked Up" (featuring KL)

2007

Marvin Gaye - Here, My Dear (expanded edition) 
 2-02. "I Met a Little Girl (Alternate Version)"

Wu-Tang Clan - 8 Diagrams 
 02. "Take It Back" (co-produced by RZA)

2008

Coke La Rock & Melle Mel - Hello, Merry Christmas Baby (digital single) 
 01. "Hello, Merry Christmas Baby"

Termanology - Politics as Usual 
 01. "It's Time"

2009

Cormega - Born and Raised 
 04. "Get It In" (featuring Lil' Fame)

2013

L'Or Du Commun - L'Origine 
 06. "La Tarte Aux Frites"

Redman - N/A 
 00. "Hands Up" (featuring Mr. Cheeks & DoItAll)

2014

Various artists - Golden Era Records Mixtape 2014 
 09. "Keep Clear" (performed by Vents)

2015

Black Rob - Genuine Article 
 04. "Need That Real Ish" (featuring Sean Price & Tek)

Easy Mo Bee & Emskee - Two for One 
 01. "It's Over"
 02. "The Incredible Lyrical"
 03. "Get Ready (Here It Comes)"
 04. "The Everyday"
 05. "My Death Premonition"
 06. "The Shorty Watchtower" (featuring Jesus Mason & Oxygen) 
 07. "Sick Service"
 08. "Caz Realism" (featuring Grandmaster Caz)
 09. "Black Radio" (featuring Dumi Right & The Saint)
 10. "Acts for the Climax"

Wiz Khalifa - Cabin Fever 3 
 08. "Call Again" (featuring Problem & Juicy J)

2016

Sadat X - Agua 
 17. "We Strive" (featuring Dres)

2018

Wiz Khalifa - Rolling Papers 2 
 18. "Gin and Drugs" (featuring Problem)

2019

Easy Mo Bee & Big D - This Is My Life 
 01. "Chuck Chillout Intro"	
 02. "Make It Anywhere" (featuring Will Porter)
 03. "Behold" (featuring Venge Millz)
 04. "I Can't Talk" (featuring Dane Uno & Kool Keith)
 05. "Supreme Gangster" (featuring Jus)
 06. "Pass That Shit" (featuring Dane Uno & Kool Keith)
 07. "I Rep NY" (featuring Elgee, Poison Pen & Skanks the Rap Martyr)
 09. "I Miss You" (featuring Petawayne)
 10. "Back in the Day" (featuring Fel'on, Lega Cee & Will Porter)
 11. "My Mind Right" (featuring Will Porter)
 12. "Frankenstein Mafia" (featuring Kool Keith)
 17. "The Heist" (featuring Fel'on, Lega Cee & Will Porter)
 18. "Too Raw" (featuring Lil' Fame & Will Porter)
 19. "Gangster Shit" (featuring Fel'on, Lega Cee & Will Porter)
 20. "I Rep NY (Remix)" (featuring Devastating Tito, Grandmaster Caz, Mic Handz, Percee P, Peter Gunz & Raf Almighty)

2020

Public Enemy - What You Gonna Do When the Grid Goes Down?
15. "Rest in Beats" (featuring The Impossebulls) (produced by C-Doc & Easy Mo Bee)

References

External links
Easy Mo Bee credits at Discogs

 
Discographies of American artists
Hip hop discographies
Production discographies